Senator Bayard may refer to:

James A. Bayard (politician, born 1767) (1767–1815), U.S. Senator from Delaware
James A. Bayard Jr. (1799–1880), U.S. Senator from Delaware
Richard H. Bayard (1796–1868), U.S. Senator from Delaware
Thomas F. Bayard (1828–1898), U.S. Senator from Delaware
Thomas F. Bayard Jr. (1868–1942), U.S. Senator from Delaware in the 1920s